Sebastián Mariano Calleja (born February 2, 1979 in Buenos Aires, Argentina) is a former Argentine footballer who played for clubs of Argentina, Chile, Colombia, Honduras, Spain, Italy, Slovenia and Malaysia. He played as a midfielder.

Teams
  Argentinos Juniors 1996-1998
  RCD Mallorca B 1999-2000
  Bari 2001
  Olimpija Ljubljana 2001-2002
  Once Caldas 2003-2004
  Deportes La Serena 2004 
  Johor Bahru City 2005
  Hispano FC 2007

Titles
  Once Caldas 2003 (Torneo Apertura Colombian Primera División Championship), 2004 (Copa Libertadores de América)

References

External links
 

1979 births
Living people
Argentine footballers
Argentine expatriate footballers
Argentinos Juniors footballers
NK Olimpija Ljubljana (1945–2005) players
Once Caldas footballers
Deportes La Serena footballers
Chilean Primera División players
Categoría Primera A players
Expatriate footballers in Chile
Expatriate footballers in Colombia
Expatriate footballers in Honduras
Expatriate footballers in Italy
Expatriate footballers in Spain
Expatriate footballers in Slovenia
Expatriate footballers in Malaysia
Association football midfielders
Footballers from Buenos Aires